Christopher Stephen Sulley (born 3 December 1959) is an English former professional footballer who played as a left-back. He played 401 games in the Football League and seven games in the Scottish Football League.

He began his career at Chelsea in 1978, though did not play a league game for the club, and instead joined AFC Bournemouth in 1981. After five years on the south coast, during which he was twice promoted and lifted the Associate Members' Cup, he signed with Blackburn Rovers via Dundee United. He won the Full Members' Cup with Rovers in 1987, and stayed for six years, before moving on to Port Vale after Rovers won promotion to the top-flight in 1992. He switched to Preston North End the following year, before retiring in 1994. During his career he was involved in five play-off competitions, only one of which (Blackburn in 1992) ended in promotion.

Playing career
Sulley began his career with Chelsea, but failed to make a senior appearance at Stamford Bridge under Danny Blanchflower or Geoff Hurst, as the "Pensioners" were relegated out of the First Division in 1978–79 and then remained in the Second Division in 1979–80 and 1980–81.

He moved on to Fourth Division side AFC Bournemouth in March 1981. David Webb's side won promotion to the Third Division after occupying the final promotion place in 1981–82. They maintained their third tier status in 1982–83 and 1983–84 as new manager Don Megson was quickly replaced by Harry Redknapp. Redknapp coached the club to victory in the 1984 Associate Members' Cup Final, as they beat Hull City 2–1 at Boothferry Park. The "Cherries" continued to remain in the Third Division in 1984–85 and 1985–86, before they topped the division in 1986–87 after winning 19 of their 23 league games at Dean Court.

After making over 200 appearances for Bournemouth, he moved to Scotland to play for Dundee United in 1986. He featured only eight times for manager Jim McLean, including one appearance at the very beginning of the club's UEFA Cup run to the final and moved back to England within three months with Blackburn Rovers, converting a loan move into a £15,000 deal. He quickly built a left-sided partnership with Scott Sellars. He won the Full Members' Cup at Wembley in 1987, Colin Hendry scoring the only goal of the game against Charlton Athletic. Rovers finished the 1987–88 season in the Second Division play-off zone, but lost out to Sulley's former club Chelsea. The "Riversiders" again reached the play-offs in 1988–89, but were defeated by Crystal Palace in the final. Sulley lost his first-team place to John Millar, but later regained it. A third successive play-off appearance in 1989–90, this time Rovers lost to Swindon Town at the semi-final stage. After Rovers struggled in 1990–91 their manager Don Mackay departed. Bankrolled by Jack Walker, new manager Kenny Dalglish took the Lancashire outfit into the top-flight via the play-offs, as Rovers defeated Leicester City 1–0 in the final. In his six years with Blackburn, Sulley made close to 150 appearances, before Alan Wright managed to make the left-back position his own.

Sulley moved to John Rudge's Port Vale in July 1992, and played 53 games in league and cup in 1992–93, though missed both the Football League Trophy and play-off finals at Wembley. He then left Vale Park and signed with John Beck's Preston North End on a free transfer in June 1993. The 1993–94 season would see one last play-off heartbreak for Sulley, as the "Lambs" lost 4–2 to Wycombe Wanderers in the final.

Coaching career
After retiring in 1994, Sulley took up a coaching post with Preston North End at their centre of excellence in 1995. From there, he moved back to Blackburn Rovers and then on to Bolton Wanderers, originally as under-19s coach, in 1998. He left his position at Bolton in March 2008. In March 2011, Sulley was appointed as director of the Leeds United academy. He left the post in April 2012. In November 2013, he was appointed as joint Head of Coaching for the under-5s to under-13s at the Everton Academy. He was appointed as head of coaching at Burnley's academy in October 2016 and went on to work as an FA youth coach developer.

Personal life
He married Sue and had two children.

Career statistics

Honours
AFC Bournemouth
Associate Members' Cup: 1984
Football League Third Division: 1986–87

Blackburn Rovers
Full Members' Cup: 1987
Football League Second Division play-offs: 1992

References

1959 births
Living people
Footballers from Camberwell
English footballers
Association football fullbacks
Chelsea F.C. players
AFC Bournemouth players
Dundee United F.C. players
Blackburn Rovers F.C. players
Port Vale F.C. players
Preston North End F.C. players
Association football coaches
Preston North End F.C. non-playing staff
Blackburn Rovers F.C. non-playing staff
Bolton Wanderers F.C. non-playing staff
Leeds United F.C. non-playing staff
Everton F.C. non-playing staff
Burnley F.C. non-playing staff
English Football League players
Scottish Football League players